Robert Lynd may refer to:

Robert Staughton Lynd (1892–1970), American sociologist
Robert Wilson Lynd (1879–1949), Irish writer

See also
Bob Lind (born 1942), singer/songwriter